The 2005–06 Butler Bulldogs men's basketball team represented Butler University in the 2005–06 NCAA Division I men's basketball season. Their head coach was Todd Lickliter, serving his 5th year. The Bulldogs played their home games at Hinkle Fieldhouse.

The Bulldogs earned an at-large bid to the 2006 National Invitation Tournament, earning an 8 seed in the Cincinnati bracket. They beat 7 seed Miami (OH) 53–42 in the opening round before falling to 2 seed Florida State 67–63 in the first round.

Roster

Schedule

|-
!colspan=9 style="background:#13294B; color:#FFFFFF;"| Non-Conference Regular Season

|-
!colspan=9 style="background:#13294B; color:#FFFFFF;"| Horizon League Play

|-
!colspan=9 style="background:#13294B; color:#FFFFFF;"| Horizon League tournament

|-
!colspan=9 style="background:#13294B; color:#FFFFFF;"| NIT

References

Butler Bulldogs
Butler Bulldogs
Butler Bulldogs men's basketball seasons
Butl
Butl